! (pronounced "blah") is the debut studio album by Portuguese singer Cláudia Pascoal. It was released in Portugal on 27 March 2020 by Universal Music Portugal. The album peaked at number six on the Portuguese Albums Chart.

Track listing

Charts

Release history

References

2020 debut albums
Portuguese-language albums

Cláudia Pascoal albums